Malus sieboldii, commonly called Siebold's crab, Siebold's crabapple or Toringo crabapple, is a species of crabapple in the family Rosaceae.

Taxonomy
Some botanists have reclassified it as Malus toringo.

Varieties
It is sometimes considered to have three varieties: 
 Malus sieboldii var. sieboldii (the true Siebold's crabapple)
 Malus sieboldii var. sargentii, which is sometimes considered to be a separate species Malus sargentii
 Malus sieboldii var. zumi

The cultivar Malus toringo 'Scarlett' has received the Royal Horticultural Society's Award of Garden Merit.

Distribution
Malus sieboldii—Malus toringo is native to eastern temperate Asia, in China, Japan, and Korea.

See also

Disease resistance breeding

References

External links 

sieboldii
Crabapples
Flora of China
Flora of Japan
Flora of Korea
Flora of temperate Asia